Vrmac is a mountain in south-western Montenegro, overlooking the coastal town of Tivat and a peninsula dividing Tivat Bay from Kotor Bay.

It is an extension of Mount Lovćen, and its highest peak is Sveti Ilija (Saint Elijah), which is 785 meters high. It is located north of town of Tivat, and encloses town of Kotor from the south. It is also the site of the Austro-Hungarian Fort Vrmac, built in 1860.

Vrmac Tunnel, which connects Kotor with the Adriatic Highway, goes through the mountain. Vrmac is a popular destination for hiking, orienteering and mountain biking.

See also
Fort Vrmac
Vrmac Tunnel

References

Mountains of Montenegro
Tivat Municipality
Bay of Kotor
Peninsulas of Montenegro
Kotor Municipality